Oğuzhan Akgün (born 13 July 2001) is a Turkish professional footballer who plays as a winger for Sakaryaspor on loan from the Süper Lig club Beşiktaş.

References

2001 births
Living people
Turkish footballers
İstanbulspor footballers
Beşiktaş J.K. footballers
Altınordu F.K. players
Süper Lig players
TFF First League players
TFF Second League players
Association football forwards
Turkey youth international footballers